Artedia is a genus of flowering plant in the Apiaceae. Its only species is Artedia squamata, native to Cyprus, Western Asia and the Transcaucasus.

Carl Linnaeus named the species after his friend, the naturalist Peter Artedi.

References

Apioideae
Flora of Cyprus
Flora of Western Asia
Flora of the Transcaucasus
Monotypic Apioideae genera